Arthur Abrams may refer to:

Arthur Abrams, character in Knight Rider (season 2)
Artie Abrams, character in Glee
Art Abrams from Cauliflower Alley Club